Valerie Stevens may refer to:

Valerie Stevens, candidate in Manchester Council election, 1982
Valerie Stevens, character in V (2009 TV series)
Val Stevens, Washington politician